Minimalism is a movement in visual arts, music, and other media that began in post–World War II Western art.

Minimalism may also refer to:

Minimalism (computing), a philosophy of programming and configuring computers
Minimalism (philosophy), a theory that truth does not provide useful information beyond the proposition or sentence
Minimalism (syntax), a theory of natural language syntax developed by Noam Chomsky in the 1990s
Minimalism (technical communication), a theory of task-oriented and user-centered instruction and documentation
Minimalism (visual arts), art movement to expose the essence, essentials or identity of a subject through eliminating all non-essential forms, features or concepts
Minimalist music, a form of art music that employs limited or minimal musical materials
Judicial minimalism, a philosophy in United States constitutional law
Biblical minimalism, a movement or trend in biblical scholarship holding that the Bible is not reliable evidence for history, and that "Israel" is a problematic subject for historical study
Simple living, voluntary practices to simplify one's lifestyle by reducing one's possessions

See also
, or containing 
Minimal (disambiguation)
Minimisation (disambiguation)
Concision